Agioi Anargyroi railway station is a station on the Piraeus–Platy railway line in Agioi Anargyroi, a suburb in the north-central part of Athens, Greece. It is located at the junction of Dimokratias and Psaron streets, opposite Kokkinopoulou Square, and has two island platforms. It was opened on 8 August 2010, replacing an older station of the same name. It is located close to the Hellenic Army's Agioi Anargyroi military base.

History
The new station should not be confused with the old station of the former Piraeus–Patras railway, located north of the current station on Iroon Polytechniou street between Aretis and Distomou streets, which closed in July 2007. Maintenance works were carried out in 2019, in part to repair water damage from winter flooding the previous year.

Facilities
The station building is above the platforms, with access to the platform level via stairs or lifts. The station buildings are also equipped with toilets and a staffed ticket office. At platform level, there are sheltered seating and Dot-matrix display departure and arrival screens or timetable poster boards on both platforms on all four platforms. Access to platforms 1-4 is via the main concourse. Platforms 3 & 4 are much longer than Platforms 1 & 2. To the left of the station buildings, there is a passenger car park, with free parking. Outside the station, there is a bus stop where the local 420, 711, 719, 735, A10, A11, B10, B11, B12 & L12 call. Road access to the station is provided by a small square that opens out onto Leof. Dimokratias.

Services 

Since 15 May 2022, the following weekday services call at this station:

Station layout

Future
In 2021, plans were announced to restore the old metre-gauge line of the Piraeus–Patras railway between Agioi Anargyroi and Athens railway station.

See also
Railway stations in Greece
Hellenic Railways Organization
Hellenic Train
Proastiakos

References

External links
 Agioi Anargyroi railway station - National Railway Network Greek Travel Pages

Fyli
West Athens (regional unit)
Attica
Railway
Railway stations in Attica
Buildings and structures in Athens
Transport in Athens
Transport in Attica
Transport in West Attica
Railway stations opened in 2010